Regional Mexican Airplay (also referred to as Regional Mexican Songs) is a record chart published by Billboard magazine. It was established by the magazine on October 8, 1994, with "La Niña Fresa" by Banda Zeta being the first number-one song on the chart. The chart mainly focuses on the styles of music from the different rural regions of Mexico such as Mariachi, Norteño, and Banda, as well as the Mexican-American community in the United States such as Tejano. These genres are collectively referred to as "Regional Mexican" under the Latin music umbrella. This chart features only singles or tracks and like most Billboard charts, is based on airplay; the radio charts are compiled using information tracked by from Nielsen Broadcast Data Systems (BDS), which electronically monitors radio stations in more than 140 markets across the United States. The audience charts cross-reference BDS data with listener information compiled by the Arbitron ratings system to determine the approximate number of audience impressions made for plays in each daypart.
The current number one song is "Bebé Dame" by Fuerza Regida and Grupo Frontera.

Records

Artist with the most number-one hits

Artists with the most top-ten hits

Top 10 songs of all time (1994–2021)
In 2018, Billboard magazine compiled a ranking of the 20 best-performing songs on the chart since its inception in 1994. The chart is based on the most number of weeks the song spent on top of the chart. For songs with the same number of weeks at number one, they are ranked by the most weeks in the top ten, followed by most total weeks on the chart. The list was updated in 2021.

Billboard Regional Mexican Airplay number-one songs of the year
1995: "Tú, Sólo Tú" by Selena
1996: "Un Millón de Rosas" by La Mafia
1997: "Ya Me Voy Para Siempre" by Los Temerarios
1998: "¿Porqué Te Conocí?" by Los Temerarios
1999: "Necesito Decirte" by Conjunto Primavera
2000: "El Listón de tu Pelo" by Los Angeles Azules
2001: "Y Llegaste Tú" by Banda El Recodo
2002: "No Me Conoces Aún" by Palomo
2003: "Una Vez Más" by Conjunto Primavera
2004: "Dos Locos" by Los Horóscopos de Durango
2005: "Hoy Como Ayer" by Conjunto Primavera
2006: "Aliado del Tiempo" by Mariano Barba
2007: "Dime Quién Es" by Los Rieleros del Norte
2008: "Hasta el Día de Hoy" by Los Dareyes de la Sierra
2009: "Te Presumo" by Banda El Recodo
2010: "Ando Bien Pedo" by Banda Los Recoditos
2011: "Me Encantaría" by Fidel Rueda
2012: "Llamada de Mi Ex" by La Arrolladora Banda El Limón
2013: "El Ruido de Tus Zapatos" by La Arrolladora Banda El Limón
2014: "Hermosa Experiencia" by Banda MS
2015: "Levantando Polvadera" by Voz de Mando
2016: "Solo Con Verte" by Banda MS
2017: "Regresa Hermosa" by Gerardo Ortíz
2018: "Oye Mujer" by Raymix
2019: "A Través del Vaso" by Banda Los Sebastianes
2020: "Escondidos" by Banda La Adictiva
2021: "Te Volvería a Elegir" by Calibre 50
2022: "Cada Quien" by Grupo Firme ft. Maluma

Decade-end charts
2000s: "No Me Conoces Aún" by Palomo

See also
Regional styles of Mexican music

References
General

.

Specific

External links
 Current Billboard Regional Mexican Airplay chart 

Billboard charts
Mexican-American culture
Regional styles of Mexican music